The St. Joseph's Mission near Culdesac, Idaho is a wood-frame building which was listed on the National Register of Historic Places in 1976.

The nave was extended in 1904.

See also
 List of National Historic Landmarks in Idaho
 National Register of Historic Places listings in Lewis County, Idaho

References

External links

1874 establishments in Idaho Territory
Buildings and structures in Lewis County, Idaho
Roman Catholic churches completed in 1874
Former Roman Catholic church buildings in Idaho
Churches on the National Register of Historic Places in Idaho
National Register of Historic Places in Lewis County, Idaho
19th-century Roman Catholic church buildings in the United States